Amy Lynn Chua (born October 26, 1962), also known as "the Tiger Mom", is an American corporate lawyer, legal scholar, and writer. She is the John M. Duff Jr. Professor of Law at Yale Law School with an expertise in international business transactions, law and development, ethnic conflict, and globalization. She joined the Yale faculty in 2001 after teaching at Duke Law School for seven years. Prior to teaching, she was a corporate law associate at Cleary, Gottlieb, Steen & Hamilton. 
Chua is also known for her parenting memoir Battle Hymn of the Tiger Mother. In 2011, she was named one of Time magazine's 100 most influential people, one of The Atlantic Brave Thinkers, and one of Foreign Policy Global Thinkers.

Family background
Chua was born in Champaign, Illinois, to ethnic Chinese-Filipino parents with Hoklo ancestry who emigrated from the Philippines. Her parents raised her speaking Hokkien. Her father, Leon O. Chua, is a professor of electrical engineering and computer science at the University of California, Berkeley. His ancestral hometown is Quanzhou, Fujian.

Chua's mother was born in China in 1936, before moving to the Philippines at the age of two. She subsequently converted to Catholicism in high school and graduated from the University of Santo Tomas, with a degree in chemical engineering,  summa cum laude.

Early life and education
Chua was raised Catholic and lived in West Lafayette, Indiana. When she was 8 years old, her family moved to Berkeley, California.
 
Chua described herself as an "ugly kid" during her school days; she was bullied in school for her foreign accent (which she has since lost) and was the target of racial slurs from several classmates. She went to El Cerrito High School, in El Cerrito, where she graduated as valedictorian of her class. In college, she graduated Phi Beta Kappa and magna cum laude with an A.B. in Economics in 1984 from Harvard College, where she was named an Elizabeth Cary Agassiz Scholar and a John Harvard Scholar. She obtained her J.D. cum laude in 1987 from Harvard Law School, where she was the first Asian American officer of the Harvard Law Review, serving as executive editor.

After law school, Chua clerked for Chief Judge Patricia M. Wald on the United States Court of Appeals for the D.C. Circuit.

Books
Chua has written five books: two studies of international affairs, a parenting memoir, a book on ethnic-American culture and its correlation with socio-economic success within the United States, and a book about the role of tribal loyalties in American politics and its foreign policy.

Her first book, World on Fire: How Exporting Free Market Democracy Breeds Ethnic Hatred and Global Instability (2003), explores the ethnic conflict caused in many societies by disproportionate economic and political influence of "market dominant minorities" and the resulting resentment in the less affluent majority. World on Fire, which was a New York Times bestseller, selected by The Economist as one of the Best Books of 2003, and named by Tony Giddens in The Guardian as one of the "Top Political Reads of 2003", examines how globalization and democratization since 1989 have affected the relationship between market-dominant minorities and the wider population.

Her second book, Day of Empire: How Hyperpowers Rise to Global Dominance – and Why They Fall (2007), examines seven major empires and posits that their success depended on their tolerance of minorities.

Chua's third book, Battle Hymn of the Tiger Mother, published in January 2011, is a memoir about her parenting journey using strict Confucianist child rearing techniques, which she claims is typical for Chinese immigrant parents. Despite being sometimes interpreted as a how-to manual for parenting, the book has been critically viewed as an account "of how children can become rebellious and alienated when one-size-fits-all education philosophies are applied, regardless of their personality or aptitudes." It was an international bestseller in the United States, South Korea, Poland, Israel, Germany, United Kingdom, and China, and has been translated into 30 languages. The book also received a huge backlash and media attention and ignited global debate about different parenting techniques and cultural attitudes that foster such techniques. The uproar provoked by the book included death threats and racial slurs directed at Chua, and calls for her arrest on child-abuse charges.

Chua taught J. D. Vance during at least his first year at Yale Law. She persuaded him to write his memoir Hillbilly Elegy, which became a New York Times bestseller and a film starring Amy Adams and Glenn Close.

Her fourth book, co-written with husband Jed Rubenfeld, is The Triple Package: How Three Unlikely Traits Explain the Rise and Fall of Cultural Groups in America (published in February 2014). The book received mixed reviews. Lucy Kellaway, writing for Financial Times, called it "the best universal theory of success I've seen." Emma Brockes, writing in The Guardian, commended the book for "draw[ing] on eye-opening studies of the influence of stereotypes and expectations on various ethnic and cultural groups ... The authors' willingness to pursue an intellectual inquiry that others wouldn't is bracing." However, The Guardian also published a satirical review-cum-summary written by John Crace, who used one of the Triple Package traits—impulse control—to tell potential readers to "resist this book." The book was also roundly criticized for  cultural stereotyping and ignoring additional factors such as intergenerational wealth transmission. Forbes writer Susan Adams criticized it for racist overtones and said Chua's suggestion that certain cultural groups are more conventionally successful than others given her "three-pronged prescription [for success]" is at best "pop psychology." An empirical study by Joshua Hart and Christopher Chabris found that "[t]here was little evidence for the Triple Package theory."

In February 2018, Chua's fifth book was published. Titled Political Tribes: Group Instinct and the Fate of Nations, it examines how group loyalty often outweighs any other ideological considerations. She argues that the failure to recognize the place of group loyalty has played a major role in the failure of US foreign policy and the rise of Donald Trump. The book received overwhelmingly positive reviews from across the political spectrum. David Frum, writing for The New York Times, praised Chua for her willingness to approach "the no-go areas around which others usually tiptoe." The Washington Post described the book as "compact, insightful, disquieting, yet ultimately hopeful," and Ezra Klein called the book "fascinating" on his podcast.

The book received a few criticisms. The Guardian called it "a well-intentioned book that never quite comes together." The Financial Times stated that it was "an important book" and supported Chua's argument "that America's liberal elite has contributed to Trump's rise by failing to acknowledge its own sense of tribalism"; it did, however, also state that it left the "crucial question" of how to create a "non-tribal world" unanswered.

Yale Law School

Chua is known for mentoring students from marginalized communities and for helping students get judicial clerkships. In 2018, HuffPost and The Guardian alleged that Chua had advised female students to dress "outgoing" when seeking employment. Chua denied this claim. In 2019, Chua agreed not to drink or socialize with students outside of class.

Personal life

Chua lives in New Haven, Connecticut, and is married to Yale Law School professor Jed Rubenfeld. She has two daughters, Sophia and Louisa ("Lulu"). The former appeared in the New Yorker in 2014 as a Harvard member of Kappa Alpha Theta and ROTC.

Bibliography
 World On Fire: How Exporting Free Market Democracy Breeds Ethnic Hatred and Global Instability. 2002. Doubleday.  
 Day of Empire: How Hyperpowers Rise to Global Dominance – and Why They Fall. 2007. Doubleday. 
 Battle Hymn of the Tiger Mother. 2011. Penguin Books. 
 The Triple Package: How Three Unlikely Traits Explain the Rise and Fall of Cultural Groups in America. 2014. Penguin Books. 
 Political Tribes: Group Instinct and the Fate of Nations. 2018. Penguin Books.

References

Further reading

External links

Biography on Battle Hymn of the Tiger Mother
Yale Law School profile
Leigh Bureau speaker profile

1962 births
Living people
21st-century American memoirists
21st-century American women writers
American academics of Chinese descent
American economics writers
American family and parenting writers
American legal writers
American political writers
American women lawyers
American women memoirists
American writers of Chinese descent
Bamboo network
Catholics from California
Catholics from Connecticut
Catholics from Illinois
Catholics from Indiana
Connecticut lawyers
Connecticut Republicans
Corporate lawyers
Development specialists
Duke University faculty
Educators from Connecticut
Harvard College alumni
Harvard Law School alumni
Hokkien people
American international relations scholars
People from Champaign, Illinois
People from West Lafayette, Indiana
American women legal scholars
American legal scholars
Writers from Berkeley, California
Writers from Illinois
Writers from Indiana
Writers from New Haven, Connecticut
Yale Law School faculty